Atila Pesyani (born 30 April 1957) is an Iranian actor. He is the son of actress Jamileh Sheykhi.

Career 
Among the movies in which he has performed are The Hidden Half (2001), Ceasefire 1 and 2 (2005 and 2014), Hidden Feeling (2006), Throughout the Night (2010), The Redemption (2010), The President's Cell Phone (2011) and The Wooden Bridge (2011).
Some series which he has played roles in are The First Night of Peace (2006), Privacy Policy (2009), Goodbye Child (2012), A Piece of Land (2012), Like a Mother (2013), Madineh (2014) and A Beautiful Revolution (2014).
Pesyani received a nomination for the Best Supporting Actor Golden Statue for the movies Two Women (1998), The Burnt Generation (1999), The Last Supper (2001) and Who Killed Amir? (2005) as well as a nomination for the Crystal Simorgh's Best Leading Actor for In Cold Blood (1994) from the Fajr International Film Festival.

References

External links 
 
 Atila Pesyani in Internet database of Soureh Cinema

Living people
1957 births
Male actors from Tehran
Iranian male film actors
Iranian male stage actors
University of Tehran alumni
Iranian male television actors